Armando Fresa (14 April 1893, Palmi - 23 October 1957) was an Italian politician and Civil Engineer Officer. 

He was elected Deputy with the Common Man's Front to the Constituent Assembly in 1946. He served as Secretary of the Common Man's Front until 24 June 1946, when he was replaced by Vincenzo Tieri. In November 1947  he left the party with Emilio Patrissi to join the National Union. He remained a Deputy until 1948.

References

1893 births
1957 deaths
Common Man's Front politicians
Members of the Constituent Assembly of Italy
Politicians of Calabria
People from Palmi
National Union (Italy, 1947) politicians